Karen Wood was a British competitive figure skater. She is the 1980 Richmond Trophy champion and a two-time British national champion (1981, 1983) in ladies' singles.

Career
Karen Wood trained in Whitley Bay, Billingham, Durham, and Deeside North Wales, passing her first test in 1971.

In 1976, Wood competed in pair skating with Stephen Baker at the World Junior Championships The pair was coached by Alan Merchant.

As a single skater, Wood placed 15th at the 1981 World Championships and 8th at the 1982 European Championships. After she withdrew from the 1983 European Championships, the National Ice Skating Association decided to remove her from the team to the World Championships, giving the spot to Alison Southwood.

Personal life
Wood had two daughters, Corrinne and Nicole. She died in December 2014 after a prolonged illness.

Competitive highlights

Single skating

Pair skating

References 

2014 deaths
British female single skaters
British female pair skaters
Year of birth missing